This is the discography for American jazz musician Richard Davis.

As leader/co-leader 
 1967: Heavy Sounds with Elvin Jones (Impulse!)
 1969: Muses for Richard Davis (MPS)
 1971: The Philosophy of the Spiritual (Cobblestone) - also released as With Understanding (Muse)
 1971: Epistrophy (Black & Blue)
 1972: Now's the Time (Muse)
 1972: Epistrophy & Now's the Time (Muse)
 1973: Dealin' (Muse)
 1973: Songs for Wounded Knee (Flying Dutchman)
 1975: As One (Muse)
 1977: Harvest (Muse) - released 1979
 1977: Way Out West (Muse) - released 1980
 1977: Fancy Free (Galaxy)
 1977: Divine Gemini (SteepleChase) with Walt Dickerson
 1977: Tenderness (SteepleChase) with Walt Dickerson - released 1985
 1979: Cauldron (Corvo)
 1987: Persia My Dear (DIW)
 1989: One for Frederick (Hep)
 1989: Body and Soul (Enja) with Archie Shepp - released 1991
 1992: I Remember Clifford (Disk Union)
 1994: Live at Sweet Basil (Evidence)
 1995: Naima (Evidence)
 1995: Reminisces (Sympatico)
 1997: Total Package (Marge)
 2001: The Bassist: Homage to Diversity (Palmetto) with John Hicks
 2001: So in Love (King)
 2008: Madison (Hazel Jazz)
 2008: Blue Monk (King)

As sideman 
With Manny Albam
 Brass on Fire (Sold State, 1966)
 The Soul of the City (Solid State, 1966)
With Louis Armstrong
Louis Armstrong and His Friends (Flying Dutchman, 1970)
With Dorothy Ashby
 The Fantastic Jazz Harp of Dorothy Ashby (Atlantic, 1965)
With Tine Asmundsen
 Madison (Hazel Jazz, 2008)
With Elek Bacsik
 I Love You (Bob Thiele Music, 1974)
With Chet Baker
 Baker's Holiday (Limelight, 1965)
With Gary Bartz
 Libra (Milestone, 1968)
With George Benson
 Shape of Things to Come (A&M Records, 1968)
With Willie Bobo
 Spanish Grease (Verve, 1965)
With Ruth Brown
 Ruth Brown '65 (Mainstream, 1965)
With Ray Bryant
Lonesome Traveler (Cadet, 1966)
Slow Freight (Cadet, 1967)
With Kenny Burrell
 A Night at the Vanguard (Argo, 1959)
With Jaki Byard
 Freedom Together! (Prestige, 1966)
 Jaki Byard with Strings! (Prestige, 1968)
 The Jaki Byard Experience (Prestige, 1968)
With Free Creek
 Music from Free Creek (Buddah, 1973)
With Candido Camero
 Beautiful (Blue Note, 1970)
With Joe Chambers
 The Almoravid (Muse, 1974)
With Creative Construction Company
 Creative Construction Company (Muse, 1970 [1975])
 Creative Construction Company Vol. II (Muse, 1970 [1976])
With Judy Collins
 Bread and Roses (Elektra, 1976)
With Eddie Daniels
First Prize! (Prestige, 1967)
With Bo Diddley
Where It All Began (Chess, 1972)
With Eric Dolphy
 Iron Man (Douglas, 1963)
 Out to Lunch! (Blue Note, 1964)
With Lou Donaldson
 Rough House Blues (Argo, 1964)
 Sophisticated Lou (Blue Note, 1973)
With Kenny Dorham
 Trompeta Toccata (Blue Note, 1964)
With Jonathan Edwards
 Have a Good Time for Me (Alto, 1973)
With Booker Ervin
 The Freedom Book (Prestige, 1963)
 The Song Book (Prestige, 1964)
 The Blues Book (Prestige, 1964)
 The Space Book (Prestige, 1964)
 Groovin' High (Prestige, 1963–64)
 Heavy!!! (Prestige, 1966)
With Art Farmer
 New York Jazz Sextet: Group Therapy (Scepter, 1966)
With Maynard Ferguson
 The Blues Roar (Mainstream, 1965)
With Ricky Ford
Loxodonta Africana (New World, 1977)
With Jimmy Forrest
 Soul Street (New Jazz, 1962)
With Frank Foster
 Soul Outing! (Prestige, 1966)
With Don Friedman
 Metamorphosis (Prestige, 1966)
With Red Garland
Equinox (Galaxy, 1978)
With Stan Getz
 Stan Getz & Bill Evans with Bill Evans (Verve, 1964[1973])
 Stan Getz Plays Music from the Soundtrack of Mickey One (MGM, 1965)
With Dizzy Gillespie
 Cornucopia (Solid State, 1969)
With Chico Hamilton
 The Further Adventures of El Chico (Impulse!, 1966)
 The Dealer (Impulse!, 1966)
With Eddie Harris
 Silver Cycles (Atlantic, 1968)
With Johnny Hartman
 The Voice That Is! (Impulse!, 1964)
With Roy Haynes
 Togyu (RCA, 1975)
With Joe Henderson
 In 'n Out (Blue Note, 1964)
 Relaxin' at Camarillo (Contemporary, 1979)
With Andrew Hill
 Black Fire (Blue Note, 1963)
 Smokestack (Blue Note, 1963)
 Judgment! (Blue Note, 1964)
 Point of Departure (Blue Note, 1964)
 Andrew!!! (Blue Note, 1964)
 Pax (Blue Note, 1965)
 Lift Every Voice (Blue Note, 1969)
 Nefertiti (East Wind, 1976)
With Don Henley
 Cass County (Capitol Records, 2015)
With Mieko Hirota
 Step Across (CBS, 1978) 
With Johnny Hodges
 Blue Rabbit (Verve, 1964) with Wild Bill Davis
 Wings & Things (Verve, 1965) with Wild Bill Davis
 Stride Right (Verve, 1966) with Earl "Fatha" Hines
With Freddie Hubbard
 The Hub of Hubbard (Blue Note, 1970)
With Bobby Hutcherson
 Dialogue (Blue Note, 1965)
With Janis Ian
 Stars (Columbia Records, 1974)
 Aftertones (Columbia Records, 1975)
 Between the Lines (Columbia Records, 1975)
 Janis Ian (Columbia Records, 1978)
 Billie's Bones (Rude Girl Records, 2004)
With Milt Jackson
 For Someone I Love (Riverside, 1963)
 Jazz 'n' Samba (Impulse!, 1964)
With Garland Jeffreys
 Garland Jeffreys (Atlantic Records, 1973)
With Budd Johnson
 Ya! Ya! (Argo, 1964)
 Off the Wall (Argo, 1964) with Joe Newman
With J. J. Johnson
 J.J.'s Broadway (Verve, 1963)
 Goodies (RCA Victor, 1965)
 Broadway Express (RCA Victor, 1965)
 Israel (CTI Records, 1968) with Kai Winding
With Elvin Jones
 Dear John C. (Impulse!, 1965)
 Heavy Sounds (Impulse!, 1967)
 Very R.A.R.E. (Trio, 1979)
 Heart to Heart (Denon, 1980)
 Love & Peace (Trio, 1982)
 Elvin Jones Jazz Machine Live at Pit Inn (Polydor Japan, 1984)
With Hank Jones
 Arigato (Progressive, 1976)
 Ain't Misbehavin' (Galaxy, 1978)
With The Thad Jones/Mel Lewis Orchestra
 Presenting Thad Jones/Mel Lewis and the Jazz Orchestra (Sold State, 1966)
 Live at the Village Vanguard (Solid State, 1967)
 Monday Night (Solid State, 1968)
 Basle, 1969 (TCB, 1969) (Released 1996)
 Central Park North (Solid State, 1969)
 Consummation (Blue Note, 1970)
With Rickie Lee Jones
 It's Like This (Artemis, 2000)
With Clifford Jordan
 These are My Roots: Clifford Jordan Plays Leadbelly (Atlantic, 1965)
 In the World (Strata-East, 1969 [1972])
 Inward Fire (Muse, 1978)
 Four Play (DIW, 1990) with James Williams and Ronnie Burrage
With Roland Kirk
 Reeds & Deeds (Mercury, 1963)
 Rip, Rig and Panic (Limelight, 1965)
With Eric Kloss
 Grits & Gravy (Prestige, 1966)
 In the Land of the Giants (Prestige, 1969)
With Hubert Laws
 The Laws of Jazz (Atlantic, 1964)
 Flute By-Laws (Atlantic, 1966)
 Wild Flower (Atlantic, 1972)
With John Lewis
 Essence (Atlantic, 1962)
 P.O.V. (Columbia, 1975)
With Charles Lloyd
 Discovery! (Columbia, 1964)
With Gloria Loring
 And Now We Come to Distances (Evolution, 1969)
With Johnny Lytle
 A Man and a Woman (Solid State, 1967)
With Junior Mance
 I Believe to My Soul (Atlantic, 1968)
With Herbie Mann
 Impressions of the Middle East (Atlantic, 1966)
 The Herbie Mann String Album (Atlantic, 1967)
With Pat Martino
 Baiyina (The Clear Evidence) (Prestige, 1968)
 The Visit! (Cobblestone, 1972) also released as Footprints
 Exit (Muse, 1976)
With Melissa Manchester
 Bright Eyes (Bells Records, 1974)
With Brother Jack McDuff
 Prelude (Prestige, 1963)
 Moon Rappin' (Blue Note, 1969)
 Check This Out (Cadet, 1972)
With Gary McFarland
 The Gary McFarland Orchestra with Bill Evans (1963)
 Soft Samba (Verve, 1963)
 The In Sound (Verve, 1965)
With Gary McFarland and Gabor Szabo
 Simpatico with Gabor Szabo (Impulse!, 1966)
With Kate & Anna McGarrigle
 Dancer with Bruised Knees (Warner Bros., 1977)
With Jimmy McGriff
 The Big Band (Solid State, 1966)
 A Bag Full of Blues (Solid State, 1967)
Groove Grease (Groove Merchant, 1971)
With Melanie
Stoneground Words (Neighborhood, 1972)
 As I See It Now (Neighborhood Records, 1975)
With Charles Mingus
 Let My Children Hear Music (Columbia, 1972)
With James Moody
 Great Day (Argo, 1963)
With Wes Montgomery
 California Dreaming (Verve, 1966)
 Road Song (A&M, 1968)
With Van Morrison
 Astral Weeks (Warner Bros., 1968)
With David Murray
 The Hill (Black Saint, 1987)
 Seasons (Pow Wow, 1999)
With Oliver Nelson
 More Blues and the Abstract Truth (Impulse!, 1964)
 Oliver Nelson Plays Michelle (Impulse!, 1966)
With David Newman
 Bigger & Better (Atlantic, 1968)
 The Many Facets of David Newman (Atlantic, 1969)
With New York Unit
 Oleo (CBS, 1989)
 Blue Bossa (Paddle Wheel, 1990)
 St. Thomas: Tribute to Great Tenors (Paddle Wheel, 1991)
 Tribute to George Adams (Paddle Wheel, 1991)
 Now's the Time (Paddle Wheel, 1992)
 Over the Rainbow (Paddle Wheel, 1992)
 Akari (Apollon, 1994)
With Laura Nyro
 Christmas and the Beads of Sweat (Columbia Records, 1970)
 Smile (Columbia, 1976)
With Danny O'Keefe
 Breezy Stories (Atlantic, 1973)
With Bonnie Raitt
 Streetlights (Warner Bros. Records, 1974)
With The Rascals
 Once Upon a Dream (Atlantic Records, 1968)
 Freedom Suite (Atlantic Records, 1969)
With Sam Rivers
 Hues (Impulse!, 1973)
With Pharoah Sanders
 Karma (Impulse!, 1969)
With Shirley Scott
 Latin Shadows (Impulse!, 1965)
 Roll 'Em: Shirley Scott Plays the Big Bands (Impulse!, 1966)
 Mystical Lady (Cadet, 1971)
With Michel Sardaby
 Michel Sardaby in New York (Sound Hills, 2002)
With Carole Bayer Sager
 ...Too (Elektra Records, 1978)
With Marlena Shaw
 Marlena (Blue Note, 1972)
With Sonny Simmons
 Burning Spirits (Contemporary, 1971)
With Carly Simon
 Hotcakes (Elektra Records, 1974)
With Paul Simon
 There Goes Rhymin' Simon (Columbia Records, 1973)
With Jimmy Smith
 Monster (Verve, 1965)
 Hoochie Coochie Man (Verve, 1966)
 Jimmy & Wes: The Dynamic Duo with Wes Montgomery (Verve, 1966)
 Further Adventures of Jimmy and Wes with Wes Montgomery (Verve, 1966)
With Phoebe Snow
 Second Childhood (Columbia Records, 1976)
With Bruce Springsteen
 Greetings from Asbury Park, N.J. (Columbia, 1973)
 Born to Run (Columbia, 1975)
With Sonny Stitt
 Mr. Bojangles (Cadet, 1973)
 Satan (Cadet, 1974)
 Stomp Off Let's Go (Flying Dutchman, 1976)
With Ed Summerlin
 Ring Out Joy (Avant-Garde, 1968)
With Clark Terry
 Mumbles (Mainstream, 1966)
With Leon Thomas
Spirits Known and Unknown (Flying Dutchman, 1969)
Full Circle (Flying Dutchman, 1973)
With Lucky Thompson
 Lucky Strikes (Prestige, 1964)
With Cal Tjader
 Soul Sauce (Verve, 1965)
 Soul Bird: Whiffenpoof (Verve, 1965)
 Soul Burst (Verve, 1966)
With The Manhattan Transfer
 Vocalese (Atlantic, 1985)
With Mickey Tucker and Roland Hanna
 The New Heritage Keyboard Quartet (Blue Note, 1973)
With Phil Upchurch
 Feeling Blue (Milestone, 1967)
With Sarah Vaughan
 Swingin' Easy (EmArcy, 1957)
With Loudon Wainwright III
 Album III (Columbia Records, 1972)
 T Shirt (Arista Records, 1976)
With Mal Waldron
 Sweet Love, Bitter (Impulse!, 1967)
With Cedar Walton
 Spectrum (Prestige, 1968)
With Walter Wanderley
 Moondreams (A&M, 1969)
With Ben Webster
 Soulmates (Riverside, 1963) with Joe Zawinul
 See You at the Fair (Impulse!, 1964)
With Reuben Wilson
 Set Us Free (Blue Note, 1971)
With Kai Winding
 More Brass (Verve, 1966)
With Jimmy Witherspoon
 Blues for Easy Livers (Prestige, 1965)
With Phil Woods
 Round Trip (Verve, 1969)
 Musique du Bois (Muse, 1974)
With Joe Zawinul
 The Rise and Fall of the Third Stream (Vortex, 1968)

References 
 

Discographies of American artists
Jazz discographies